The 2021 Worcester City Council election took place on 6 May 2021 to elect councillors to Worcester City Council in England.

Results summary

Ward results

Arboretum

Battenhall

Bedwardine

Cathedral

Claines

Gorse Hill

Nunnery

Rainbow Hill

St. Clement

St. John

St. Stephen

Warndon

References

Worcester
2021
2020s in Worcestershire